Atlanta Gas Light Company (AGLC), commonly still known as Atlanta Gas Light (AGL), is the largest natural gas wholesaler in the Southeast U.S., and is the leading subsidiary of parent company AGL Resources.  It was founded in 1856 and is headquartered in Atlanta, as is AGL Resources.  It provides distribution and metering to more than 1.6 million residential, commercial, and industrial customers in 243 communities throughout the state of Georgia.

The company was originally the direct provider of natural gas, becoming a regulated monopoly under the Georgia Public Service Commission (PSC).  Under Governor Zell Miller, the Georgia General Assembly forced it to divide into retail and wholesale divisions and compete with other retailers, starting in 1998.  The move was generally regarded as a failure, as it was not shown to have reduced prices for consumers, only making it more complicated for them to choose among 19 different marketers selling the same gas going through the same pipes as before.  AGL's retail division is Georgia Natural Gas (GNG), and is one of around a dozen remaining resellers. The wholesale division was known as  Atlanta Gas Light Services (AGLS) for some time.

In late September 2007, the Georgia Public Service Commission voted to allow AGL to construct a pipeline from the shipping terminal at Elba Island to connect with other pipelines across the state, via a pipeline that already runs across the mid-state.  This allows liquid natural gas (LNG) to be pumped into the system, providing a backup source in case hurricanes or other problems interrupt service from Louisiana.

In August 2015, it was announced that the Southern Company would purchase AGL Resources, creating an energy supply monopoly in the state since that company also owns Georgia Power, the electricity company for most of the state.

Natural gas certified marketers 
Atlanta Gas Light is a wholesaler for many natural gas marketers throughout the Atlanta metro area, including:
 Colonial Energy
 Constellation Energy
 FireSide Natural Gas
 Fuel Georgia
 Gas South
 Georgia Natural Gas
 Infinite Energy
 Just Energy
 Kratos Gas & Power, LLC
 Mansfield Power & Gas
 SCANA Energy
 Stream Energy
 Town Square Energy
 True Natural Gas
 Walton EMC Natural Gas
 Xoom Energy

References

External links
Atlanta Gas Light
Georgia Natural Gas

Natural gas companies of the United States
Energy infrastructure in Georgia (U.S. state)
Companies based in Atlanta
Southern Company
American companies established in 1856
Energy companies established in 1856
Non-renewable resource companies established in 1856
1856 establishments in Georgia (U.S. state)